The Manitoba Horse was a cavalry regiment of the Non-Permanent Active Militia of the Canadian Militia (now the Canadian Army). First formed in 1912 as the 32nd Light Horse, the regiment was redesignated later that same year as the 32nd Manitoba Horse and again in 1920 as The Manitoba Horse. In 1936, the regiment was amalgamated with The Fort Garry Horse.

Lineage of the Manitoba Horse 

 Originated on 1 April 1912, in Roblin, Manitoba, as the 32nd Light Horse.
 Redesignated on 2 November 1912, as the 32nd Manitoba Horse.
 Redesignated on 15 March 1920, as The Manitoba Horse.
 Amalgamated on 15 December 1936, with The Fort Garry Horse.

Perpetuations

The North West Rebellion 
 Boulton's Mounted Corps

The Great War 
 226th Battalion (Men of the North), CEF

History

Early History

Boulton's Mounted Corps 
On 10 April, 1885, Boulton's Mounted Corps was mobilized for active service. This unit served with Middleton's Column of the North West Field Force. On 18 September, 1885, the corps was disbanded.

32nd Manitoba Horse 
On 1 April 1912, the 32nd Light Horse was authorized for service. Its Headquarters was at Roblin and had squadrons at Roblin, Russell and Dauphin.

On 2 November 1912, the regiment was redesignated as the 32nd Manitoba Horse.

The Great War 
On 6 August 1914, Details from the 32nd Manitoba Horse were placed on active service for local protection duties.

At the start of the First World War, the 32nd Manitoba Horse was one of 6 cavalry regiments from across Western Canada to provide detachments to help form the 6th Battalion (Fort Garrys), CEF for service in the first contingent of the Canadian Expeditionary Force. The other detachments were provided from the 34th Fort Garry Horse (now The Fort Garry Horse), the 20th Border Horse (now part of the 12th Manitoba Dragoons), the 18th Manitoba Mounted Rifles, the 15th Canadian Light Horse (now the South Alberta Light Horse), and the 22nd Saskatchewan Light Horse (now part of The North Saskatchewan Regiment).

On 15 July 1916, the 226th Battalion (Men of the North), CEF was authorized for service and on 16 December 1916, the battalion embarked for Great Britain. After its arrival in the UK, on 7 April 1917, the battalion’s personnel were absorbed by the 14th Reserve Battalion, CEF to provide reinforcements for the Canadian Corps in the field. On 27 July 1917, the 226th Battalion, CEF was disbanded.

1920s-1930s 
On 15 March, 1920, as a result of the Otter Commission and the following post-war reorganization of the militia, the 32nd Manitoba Horse was Redesignated as The Manitoba Horse.

In 1932, the regiment was officially granted the perpetuation of Boulton's Mounted Corps from the North-West Rebellion.

On 15 December, 1936, as a result of the 1936 Canadian Militia reorganization, The Manitoba Horse was Amalgamated with The Fort Garry Horse.

Uniform 
The regiment’s full dress uniform consisted of a scarlet tunic with yellow facings.

Battle Honours

North-West Rebellion 

 Fish Creek
 Batoche
 North West Canada, 1885

The Great War 

 Somme, 1916
 Hill 70
 Ypres, 1917
 Amiens
 Arras, 1918
 Hindenburg Line
 Pursuit to Mons

Notable Members 

 Lieutenant Colonel Charles Arkoll Boulton
 Wing Commander William George Barker,

See Also 

 List of regiments of cavalry of the Canadian Militia (1900–1920)

References 

Fort Garry Horse
Cavalry regiments of Canada
Military units and formations of Manitoba
Military units and formations disestablished in 1936